Flowerpot Island is an island in Georgian Bay, in the Canadian province of Ontario, and is a part of Fathom Five National Marine Park. The name of the island comes from two rock pillars on its eastern shore, which look like flower pots. A third flowerpot once stood, but tumbled in 1903.

Flowerpot Island is a popular tourist destination, with camping facilities and hiking trails. The island is accessible by cruises and rigid inflatable boats from Tobermory on the Bruce Peninsula.

Formation
The Flowerpots are a type of sea stack, formed over many years as wind, rain, waves and ice hammered away at the cliff that once stood alongside the water's edge. The softer rock eroded more quickly, leaving the harder rock remaining in the shape of flowerpots with trees growing on top.

See also
 True North II
 Corporation Island for information on the Flowerpots Islands in the River Thames, London, UK

References

External links

Map of Flowerpot Island
Flowerpot Island Views 
Photographs of the Island
More Photos of Flowerpot Island

Islands of Georgian Bay
Stacks of Canada
Landforms of Bruce County
Tourist attractions in Bruce County